Mimi Wong Chi Chung (born 11 October 1982 in Hong Kong) is a Hong Kong former professional football player who currently plays as an amateur for Hong Kong Second Division club North District.

Club career
In 2004, Wong signed with Hong Kong First Division club Mutual when he was 26 years old, after this season, Wong returned to Hong Kong Second Division.

In 2010, Wong signed for First Division club Tuen Mun.

In 2014, Wong signed for Hong Kong Premier League club Eastern.

In 2015, Wong got more and more chance to play for Eastern.

In 2017, Wong was signed by Dreams.

On New Years Day 2019, Wong announced his retirement from professional football.

References

External links
 
 
 Wong Chi Chung at HKFA

1982 births
Living people
Hong Kong Premier League players
Tuen Mun SA players
Double Flower FA players
Eastern Sports Club footballers
Dreams Sports Club players
Hong Kong footballers
Association football defenders